Parisanda is a genus of minute sea snails or micromolluscs, marine gastropod molluscs in the family Skeneidae.

Species
Species within the genus Parisanda include:
 Parisanda iredalei Laseron, 1954

References

 Laseron, 1954, The Australian Zoologist, 12(1): 19

 
Skeneidae
Gastropod genera